Esther Hwang is a Korean-American model, former Miss Asian America, and former scheduling secretary for San Francisco mayor Willie Brown.

Esther Hwang was born on January 10, 1974, in Seoul, South Korea. She immigrated to America at the age of one and grew up in Los Angeles’ Korea Town.  In 1996, she won the Miss Asian America Pageant. She received a scholarship to UC Berkeley and graduated summa cum laude in 1997.  Soon after, she joined the staff of Willie Brown while he was Mayor of San Francisco.  Doing so substantially increased her web traffic and notoriety as a model.

In 2006, she began working with North Beach Models. In 2007, she graduated from San Francisco Law School. Later that year, she filed a police brutality charge in San Francisco. In 2008, Esther was diagnosed with Stage 1 breast cancer. She continues to work as a model as well as working with her charity, Pandora's Hope, for children in poverty and women with cancer.

References

External links
www.esther.com
North Beach Models' Esther Profile Page
Model Mayhem Esther Hwang Profile Page

Living people
1975 births
Female models from California
University of California, Berkeley alumni
21st-century American women